Wilfred Patterson "Bill" Guiney is a New Zealand rugby league player who represented New Zealand .

Playing career
Guiney represented Addington in the Canterbury Rugby League competition. In 1920 he was selected to play for New Zealand against Great Britain. In the match he scored New Zealand's only rugby league Test try on Lancaster Park.

Personal life
He married Marjorie Ross Hawley on July 13, 1926. He died in 1941 leaving behind his wife and a 13 year old son, 12 year old daughter and 3 year old son. He had spent time in Australia and served in the Divisional Ammunition Column of the Australian Imperial Force.

References

Living people
New Zealand rugby league players
New Zealand national rugby league team players
Canterbury rugby league team players
Addington Magpies players
Rugby league wingers
Year of birth missing (living people)